Gyula László János Strausz (26 February 1880 – 18 March 1949 in Budapest) was a Hungarian track and field athlete who competed at the 1900 Summer Olympics. He participated in the discus throw competition and finished fourteenth and in the long jump competition where he finished tenth with a distance of 6.010 metres.

References

External links

1880 births
1962 deaths
Hungarian male discus throwers
Hungarian male long jumpers
Athletes (track and field) at the 1900 Summer Olympics
Olympic athletes of Hungary
Place of birth missing